The Roman Catholic Diocese of Busan is a diocese of the Latin Church of the Catholic Church located in Busan, South Korea.

History
On 21 January 1957 Pope Pius XII erected as an Apostolic Vicariate of Busan.  It was elevated to a diocese by Pope John XXIII on 10 March 1962.

Leadership

Ordinaries

Apostolic Vicars of Pusan
John A. Choi Jae-seon (1957–1962)

Bishops of Busan
John A. Choi Jae-seon (1962–1973)
Gabriel Lee Gab-sou (1975–1999)
Augustine Cheong Myong-jo (1999–2007)
Paul Hwang Chul-soo (2007–2018)
Joseph Son Sam-seok (2019–present)

Coadjutor Bishops
Augustine Cheong Myong-jo (1998–1999)

Auxiliary Bishops
Gabriel Lee Gab-sou (1971–1975)
Paul Hwang Chul-soo (2006–2007)
Joseph Son Sam-seok (2010–2019)
Pius Sin Hozol (2021–present)

References

External links
Official site

Busan
Busan
Christian organizations established in 1957
Busan
Roman Catholic Ecclesiastical Province of Daegu